Gautegiz Arteaga is a town in Biscay, in the northern Spanish autonomous community of the Basque Country.

It is located on the right bank of the Urdaibai estuary.

Its most emblematic building is the Arteaga Tower, a medieval castle rebuilt in the 19th century for the French empress Eugénie de Montijo.

References

External links
 GAUTEGIZ ARTEAGA in the Bernardo Estornés Lasa - Auñamendi Encyclopedia (Euskomedia Fundazioa) 

Municipalities in Biscay